Kenner Elias Jones is a Welsh conman who has more than 60 criminal convictions.

References

Welsh criminals
Living people
Year of birth missing (living people)